Yogeswaran is a Tamil given name and surname, a variant of Yogeshwara. Notable people with the name include:

Manickam Yogeswaran (born 1959), Sri Lankan Tamil musician
Sarojini Yogeswaran, Sri Lankan politician
S. Yogeswaran, Sri Lankan Tamil politician
V. Yogeswaran (1934-1989), Sri Lankan Tamil politician

Tamil masculine given names